The 6th and recent  José Maria Neves government lasted from 22 September 2014 to 22 April 2016.

Composition

References

Politics of Cape Verde
2014 in Cape Verde
2014 in politics
2015 in Cape Verde
2015 in politics
2016 in Cape Verde
2016 in politics